Bud Pollard (born John Evelyn Godson; May 12, 1895 – December 17, 1952) was a Canadian-American film director, screenwriter, film producer and actor.  Pollard is known for such films as It Happened in Harlem, The Black King, Tall, Tan, and Terrific, Victims of Persecution and The Road to Hollywood.

References

External links

American film directors
American film producers
American male film actors
1886 births
1952 deaths
20th-century American male actors
20th-century American screenwriters
Canadian emigrants to the United States